"Stop Breaking My Heart" is a song by American R&B/soul singer Rahsaan Patterson, released in 2007. The song is the lead single in support of his album, Wines & Spirits.The song peaked at No.59 on Billboard's Hot R&B/Hip-Hop Songs chart.

Track listing
US digital single

Charts

References

2007 singles
Rahsaan Patterson songs
Songs written by Rahsaan Patterson
Songs written by Audius Mtawarira
2007 songs